Alhaji Sheikh Abubakre Sidiq Bello (Aiyepe) RTA born on 6 May 1959 in Aiyepe town of Ijebu, Ogun State Nigeria He lived a civilised and spiritual life and made people of his society, Muslims (within and outside Nigeria) understand the physical and spiritual view of everything called life. Abubakre Sidiq Bello of Aiyepe is the Abubakre Sidiq Bello of the World.

Sheikh Abubakre Sidiq Bello was the Spiritual Founder of Dairat Sidiq Faedot Tijanniyat of Nigeria founded in 1985.

Being a Sufi Sheikh, he led so many Muslims in the line of Tijaniyyah following the doctrines of Sheikh Ahmada Tijani, the spiritual founder of Tijaniyyah which is widely practice in West Africa today.
Sheikh Abubakre Sidiq Bello worked with Great Sheikhs in the world; like Sheikh Ibrahim Niyas, Sheikh Jamiu Bulala, Sheikh Rabiu Adebayo, Sheikh Muhammadul Awwal (RTA)s just to mention few.

Nigerian Muslims
Tijaniyyah order